Nocticron („Night-time“ from latin nox, noctis „night“ and ancient Greek kronos „time“) is the brand name of Leica lenses with an extreme speed of f/1.2. Because of the large aperture size and its image stabilisation system it is possible to take images with relatively short exposure time especially in available light situations. Together with the high number of nine diaphragm blades the lens creates a strong and pleasant bokeh.

Market position 
Nocticron lenses are slower than Noctilux lenses (f/0,95 or f/1,0) and faster than the Leica-lenses with the brand name Summilux (f/1,4), Summicron (f/2,0) and Elmarit (f/2,8).

Description 
Nocticron prime lenses are offered as exchangeable lenses for the Micro Four Thirds system (MFT). At photokina 2012 the model Lumix Leica DG Nocticron 1:1,2/42.5 mm ASPH was announced, and it is available since 2014.

Leica lenses with the model name attribute DG are made by Panasonic under licence.

The lens has a focussing as well as an aperture ring, it is relatively large and heavy, and it is not water or dust proof.

The anti-reflective coating of the telephoto lens with 1.7 times normal focal length has 14 lenses in 11 groups, two of them aspheric and another with extremely low dispersion. The front lens is made of extremely high refracting glass. The Nocticron has an excellent image quality.

The Nocticron lenses allow a fast lens-body communication for autofocussing with its rather silent stepper motor, due to the large aperture size also at low light conditions.

Image stabilisation 
As of March 2023, while there are other f/1.2 autofocus lenses, it is still the fastest lens with both image stabilisation and autofocus.

The optical image stabilisation of the lens can even be combined with the opto-mechanical image stabilisation systems of some camera bodies of the system (Dual Image Stabilisation = Dual I.S.). The ‘’Dual I.S.’’ mode can be used only if the firmware of the Nocticron has version 1.2 or higher.

Gallery 
The following images show some extraordinary capabilities of the Nocticron such as at low light, at high speed, for strong bokeh or with image stabilisation.

Comparison 
Compared to other camera systems with differing normal focal lengths, and therefore different image sensor sizes, the following equivalent values apply to lenses with appropriate properties as the Nocticron 42,5 mm 1,2 within the Micro-Four-Thirds system (MFT). With the parameters given in the table in all camera systems the photographer will get the same angle of view, depth of field, diffraction limitation and motion blur:

External links 

 LEICA DG NOCTICRON 42.5mm / F1.2 Aspheric Power O.I.S.

References 

Leica lenses
Panasonic Micro Four Thirds lenses